Colby Ward, (born January 2, 1964), is an American former professional baseball player. Ward pitched for the Cleveland Indians of the Major League Baseball (MLB).

Ward batted right-handed and fielded and threw right-handed as well. He is 6'2 and weighed 185 lbs. He played his first MLB game on July 27, 1990, and played his last MLB game on September 27 of the same season.  He finished his MLB career with a 1-3 won-loss record.

Ward attended Brigham Young University. While at BYU Colby Ward set the record for best win–loss record (31–10), as well as most pitching decisions (51). Both records still stand.

Ward was drafted by the California Angels in the 11th round of the 1986 Major League Baseball draft.

External links

1964 births
Living people
American expatriate baseball players in Canada
Baseball players from Michigan
BYU Cougars baseball players
Canton-Akron Indians players
Cleveland Indians players
Colorado Springs Sky Sox players
Edmonton Trappers players
Major League Baseball pitchers
Midland Angels players
Palm Springs Angels players
Salem Angels players
Sportspeople from Lansing, Michigan
Anchorage Glacier Pilots players